Leipzig-Thekla is a railway station located in Leipzig, Germany. The station is located on the connection of Leipzig–Eilenburg railway and Leipzig-Wahren–Leipzig-Engelsdorf railway, part of the Leipzig Freight Ring. Passenger services are operated by DB Regio. Since December 2013 the station is served by the S-Bahn Mitteldeutschland.

Train services
The following services currently call at the station:

External links

References

Thekla
Leipzig Thekla